This list of College of the Holy Cross alumni includes graduates and non-graduate, former students at the College of the Holy Cross. Since its founding in 1843 and its first commencement in 1849, Holy Cross has graduated 171 classes of students. As of the 2019-20 academic year, Holy Cross had approximately 38,511 alumni.

Artists, poets and authors
Vito Acconci 1962, artist and architect
Philip Berrigan 1950, author and activist
Billy Collins 1963, former Poet Laureate of the United States
Leo Cullum 1963, cartoonist best known for his work in The New Yorker
Michael Earls 1895, Jesuit priest, writer, poet, teacher, and Holy Cross administrator
Michael Harrington 1947, socialist historian and author of The Other America, which is believed to have inspired Lyndon Johnson's Great Society social programs
Michael Harvey 1980, author of The Chicago Way and The Fifth Floor; co-creator of the TV program Cold Case Files
Jack Higgins 1976, Pulitzer Prize–winning editorial cartoonist for the Chicago Sun Times
Kristan Higgins, New York Times bestselling romance author
Edward P. Jones 1972, MacArthur Award winner and 2004 Pulitzer Prize Award in Fiction for his novel The Known World
Kristyn Kusek 1996, author and magazine editor 
Paul LeClerc 1963, President Emeritus of the New York Public Library
Karen M. McManus 1991, international bestselling author of "One of Us Is Lying", "Two Can Keep a Secret", "One of Us Is Next", and "The Cousins". 
Joe McGinniss 1964, bestselling author of The Selling of the President, Fatal Vision, and other books
Jay O'Callahan 1960, storyteller
Josh Pahigian 1996, author of The Ultimate Baseball Road Trip and more than a dozen other books
Barry Reed 1949, Boston trial lawyer and author of The Verdict, which was made into the Oscar-nominated 1982 film starring Paul Newman

Business
Bill Abbott 1984, CEO of GAC Media
Douglas M. Baker Jr. 1981, CEO of Ecolab Inc.
James E. Burke 1947, former CEO of Johnson & Johnson; named one of the ten greatest CEOs of all time by Fortune Magazine
Randall Caudill 1969, president and founder of Dunsford Hill Capital Partners
Arthur Ciocca 1959, Chairman and owner, The Wine Group
Nicholas D'Agostino Jr. 1960, Chairman, President and CEO, D'Agostino Supermarkets
Stephen D'Agostino, 1954, Chairman, President and CEO, D'Agostino Supermarkets. Chairman, President, JTL Corporation. Chairman, Food Marketing Institute
 Ben Darsney 2004, Senior director, equity capital markets at Drexel Hamilton and former Deutsche Bank Head of Equity Capital Markets 
Richard A. Davey 1995, Secretary and CEO of the Massachusetts Department of Transportation
Richard B. Fisher 1947, Chairman of Federated Securities Corp. and Vice Chairman of Federated Investors, Inc.
Joanna Geraghty 1990, President/COO of JetBlue
Joe Hazelton 1997, COO of Charleston Laboratories, Inc
Pedro Heilbron 1979, CEO of Copa Airlines
Abraham Elias Issa 1926, Jamaican businessman, entrepreneur and hotelier acclaimed as "The Father of Jamaican Tourism".
Christopher Issa 1978, CEO of Crissa Hotels in Jamaica
Joseph John Issa 1989, founder and Chairman of SuperClubs Resorts
Jason Hoitt 1999, Chief Commercial Officer Dova Pharmaceuticals
Tom Jessop 1988, head of Fidelity Digital Assets at Fidelity Investments
James W. Keyes 1977, former Chairman and CEO of Blockbuster, Inc.
John Koelmel 1974, President of HARBORcenter, former CEO of First Niagara Financial Group
Stephanie Linnartz 1990, President and CEO of Under Armour, Inc. and former president of Marriott International
Edward J. Ludwig 1973, former Chairman, President, and CEO of Becton Dickinson
Victor Luis 1988, President of Coach Inc. (COH)
William J. McDonough 1956, former President of the Federal Reserve Bank of New York and current Vice Chairman of Merrill Lynch
William E. McKenna 1947, Senior Vice President of Litton Industries, President Hunts Food, Chairman of the Board of Norton Simon Industries. President and Chairman of the Board Technicolor, Chairman of the Board Sambo’s Restaurant.
Charles E.F. Millard 1954, former Chairman of the Board, CEO Coca-Cola Bottling Company of New York
William F. O'Neil 1907, founder of the General Tire and Rubber Company
John Peterman 1963 (aka J. Peterman), catalog and retail entrepreneur
James David Power III 1953, founder of J.D. Power and Associates
Roberto Quarta 1971, partner of Clayton, Dubilier & Rice, Chairman of Italtel, and former Chairman of BBA Group
Loren Ferré Rangel 1992, vice president for new products at El Día, Inc. and a trustee of the Conservation Trust of Puerto Rico
Carolyn Risoli 1986, former President of Marc by Marc Jacobs, Marc Jacobs, Inc.
Frank Shakespeare 1946, former president of CBS Television; former director of the U.S. Information Agency; Ambassador to Portugal and Ambassador to the Vatican
Sarah Romano 2002, CFO EyeGate Pharmaceuticals, Inc.
Joe Shoen 1971, President, Chairman of the Board, and Chief Executive Officer of U-Haul
Mark Shoen 1967, largest shareholder and former Chairman of U-Haul
John T. Sinnott 1961, retired Vice Chairman of Marsh & McLennan Companies
Kieran Suckling 1986, co-founder of the Center for Biological Diversity
William J. Teuber Jr. 1973, Senior Operating Principal of Bridge Growth Partners and Former Vice Chairman of EMC Corporation
John F. Thero 1983, President and CEO, Amarin Corporation during the landmark REDUCE-IT trial and on Board of Directors at Chiasma, Inc.
Maggie Wilderotter 1977, former president and CEO, Frontier Communications and DocuSign; as of 2012 had been named one of the "Fifty Most Powerful Women in Business" by Fortune for four years in a row

Education

Professors and researchers

Arts and Entertainment
Dick Cusack 1950, actor, director and producer
Neil Donohoe 1978, former Chair and Director of the Musical Theater Division at Boston Conservatory
Ann Dowd 1978, Broadway, movie, and television actress; received the National Board of Review award and an Emmy award.
Brian Gallivan 1991, improvisational actor and executive producer of CBS TV show The McCarthys
Thomas Ian Griffith 1982, actor and screenwriter. 
Brian Gunn 1992, screenwriter
Mark Gunn (screenwriter) 1993
Dave Holmes 1994, MTV host
Neil Hopkins 1999, television and film actor and writer
Peter Jankowski 1986, executive producer, Law & Order
Douglas Netter 1942, founder, Netter Digital Entertainment and executive producer of Babylon 5
Kevin O'Connor 1990, host of PBS's This Old House
Thomas F. O'Neil 1937, former Chairman of RKO General Studios, who brought movies to television and experimented with an early coin-operated pay TV system
Bartlett Sher 1981, director of Tony Award-winning Broadway musicals South Pacific and The Light in the Piazza
Stephen Tkowski 2011, professional wrestling champion
Bob Wright 1965, Chairman of the Board and former CEO of NBC Universal; Vice Chairman of General Electric; co-founder of Autism Speaks

Law, politics, and public service

United States federal and state court justices

Executive branch and United States Cabinet members
Joseph A. Califano Jr. 1952, former U.S. Secretary of Health, Education, and Welfare and Chairman of the National Center on Addiction and Substance Abuse
Broderick D. Johnson 1978, White House Cabinet Secretary for President Obama
John William Middendorf II 1945, former U.S. Ambassador to the Netherlands and Secretary of the Navy

Members of the United States Congress

Senators

Representatives

United States governors
Bob Casey Sr. 1953, Governor of Pennsylvania 1987–1995
Edward D. DiPrete 1955, Governor of Rhode Island 1985–1991
David I. Walsh 1893, first Irish Catholic Governor and U.S. Senator for Massachusetts

Ambassadors and other diplomats from the United States
 Kevin J. McGuire, 1964 U.S. Ambassador to Namibia
John William Middendorf II 1945, former U.S. Ambassador to the Netherlands and Secretary of the Navy
Harry K. Thomas Jr. 1978, U.S. Ambassador to Bangladesh, the Philippines, and Zimbabwe

Foreign Government officials
Henri Bourassa 1890, French Canadian political leader and publisher; ideological father of Canadian nationalism
Louis-Rodrigue Masson 1853, Canadian member of Parliament, Senator, and Lieutenant-Governor of Quebec
Jarosław Wałęsa 2001, member of the Sejm, the lower chamber of Poland's Parliament; son of Lech Wałęsa
Guillermo F. Pérez-Argüello, 1973, Peruvian/Nicaraguan dual national,   UN Official and Nicaraguan Ambassador to Brazil (2002–04), nephew on his father's side of Javier Perez de Cuellar, fifth Secretary General of the United Nations (1920-2020)

Other United States political and legal figures
John B. Anderson 1957, former mayor of Worcester
Jose Cojuangco Jr. 1955, former Philippine Congressman
Michael Delaney 1991, New Hampshire Attorney General 2009–present
Mark DeSaulnier 1973, representing California's 7th State Senate district
Christopher Doherty, 1980, Mayor of Scranton, Pennsylvania since 2002
Daniel M. Donahue 2009, Massachusetts state representative in the 16th Worcester district
John Droney 1968, participated in Connecticut state politics; senior partner of Levy & Droney
Jon Favreau 2003, chief speechwriter for Barack Obama
Joseph H. Gainer 1899, 26th mayor of Providence, Rhode Island
William Glendon 1941, attorney who specialized in issues relating to the First Amendment to the United States Constitution and represented The Washington Post in the Pentagon Papers case
Kirby Hendee, Wisconsin State Senator
Robert Maheu 1939, lawyer, who worked for the FBI and CIA, and as the chief executive of Nevada operations for the industrialist Howard Hughes.
Ed Martin 1992, chairman of the Missouri Republican Party
 Joseph A. McNamara, U.S. Attorney for Vermont
Howard C. Nolan Jr. 1954, former member of the New York State Senate
John P. O'Brien 1894, former mayor of New York City
Mark Kennedy Shriver 1986, former member of Maryland legislature, Vice President and Managing Director of US Programs for Save the Children
Thomas J. Spellacy 1889, political leader and lawyer
Kathy Sullivan 1976, attorney and former chairwoman of the New Hampshire Democratic Party
Jane Sullivan Roberts 1976, leads the in-house practice group at Major, Lindsey & Africa; wife of Chief Justice John Roberts
Austin J. Tobin 1925, former director of the Port Authority of New York and New Jersey 1942–1972; oversaw the construction of the World Trade Center
Ted Wells 1972, lawyer, rated by The National Law Journal as one of America's best white-collar defense attorneys
Edward Bennett Williams 1941, trial attorney; former owner of Baltimore Orioles and the Washington Redskins
James Assion Wright 1923, lawyer from Pennsylvania who served in the U.S. Congress from 1941 to 1945

Military

Media and communication
Dave Anderson 1951, New York Times sports columnist, 1981 winner of the Pulitzer Prize for commentary
George-Édouard Desbarats 1850, Canadian printer and inventor
Chris Matthews 1967, host of MSNBC's Hardball with Chris Matthews and NBC's The Chris Matthews Show
Brian W. McNeill 1979, President, Alta Communications
Gordon Peterson 1960, broadcast journalist and television news anchor; co-anchor for ABC affiliate WJLA-TV and moderator and producer of Inside Washington
Dan Shaughnessy 1975, sports columnist for the Boston Globe
Bill Simmons 1992, HBO Sports personality, founder of The Ringer, founder of Grantland and formerly ESPN sports columnist and podcaster (Page 2 and The BS report), founder and co-creator of ESPN hit documentary series 30 for 30 
Ed Walsh 1969, WBZ NewsRadio 1030-AM, morning news anchor

Religion

Science, technology, and medicine
Arthur L. Beaudet, M.D. 1963, Henry and Emma Meyer Professor; Chair of Department of Molecular and Human Genetics, Baylor College of Medicine; known for his pioneering work in gene therapy, particularly the muscular dystrophy gene
Helen W. Boucher, M.D. 1986, Director of Infectious Disease at Tufts Medical Center, Scientific Advisory Board Entasis Therapeutics
Edward Bove, M.D. 1968, Professor of Surgery at the University of Michigan School of Medicine, recognized for his contributions to the repair of congenital heart defects
James William Colbert Jr., M.D. 1942, first Provost of Medical University of South Carolina and dean emeritus of St. Louis University School of Medicine
James J. Collins, Ph.D. 1987, Rhodes Scholar, 2003 MacArthur Fellow and Termeer Professor of Medical Engineering & Science at MIT 
Benjamin Covino, M.D., Ph.D. 1951, Regional anesthesia pioneer and first Chairman of the Anesthesiology Department at Brigham and Women’s Hospital
Gerard Doherty, M.D. 1982, Moseley Professor at Harvard Medical School and Chair of Surgery at Brigham and Women’s Hospital and Dana-Farber Cancer Institute
John P. Donohue, M.D. 1954, pioneered the development of chemotherapy and nerve sparing surgical techniques for testicular cancer
Anthony Fauci, M.D. 1962, head of the National Institute of Allergy and Infectious Diseases, National Institutes of Health
John A. Fallon, M.D., M.B.A. 1970, on the Board of Directors for numerous companies including  Exact Sciences Corporation
Robert Harrington, M.D. 1982 American Heart Association president.
Thomas W. Hungerford, 1959, mathematician and author of many textbooks including ''Abstract algebra:
Joseph P. Kerwin, M.D. 1953, astronaut who spent 28 days in space for the Skylab 2 mission
David McDowell, B.A., M.A., M.D. 1985, psychiatrist, author, expert on substance abuse treatment
Joseph E. Murray, M.D. 1940, Nobel Prize in Medicine for the first successful kidney transplant
William Nolen, M.D. 1950, surgeon and author
Jennifer Schneider, M.D. 1997, President and Chief Medical Officer at Livongo.
James Augustine Shannon, M.D. 1925, former Director of the National Institutes of Health
Tony Stankus, MLS, FSLA 1973. Most published science librarian in the world, 2011-2015. https://doi.org/10.1080/0194262X.2017.1323070
Steven Stack 1994, youngest American Medical Association president.
Gordon Zubrod, M.D. 1936, received the Lasker Award in 1972 for his work in cancer research

Sports

Baseball
Brian Abraham 2007, World Series Champion with the Boston Red Sox
John Joseph "Jack" Barry 1905, shortstop, second baseman, and manager in Major League Baseball, and later a renowned college baseball coach 
Dick Berardino 1957, player development consultant for the Boston Red Sox
Matt Blake 2007, New York Yankees pitching coach
Pat Bourque 1969, first baseman in Major League Baseball; played on the 1973 Oakland Athletic World Series Championship team
Ownie Carroll 1925, Major League Baseball pitcher for eleven seasons; baseball coach at Seton Hall 1948–1972
Declan Cronin 2019, drafted by the Chicago White Sox
Gene Desautels 1930, catcher in Major League Baseball who played with four different teams between 1930 and 1946
Liam Dvorak 2021, RHP for the Irish National Team 
Joseph "Jumping Joe" Dugan 1920, late Major League Baseball player
John Freeman 1927, played for the Boston Red Sox
Jack Hoey 1903, MLB outfielder for the Boston Red Sox
Dick Joyce 1965, major league pitcher; member of the Cheverus and Holy Cross Hall of Fame; member of Maine Baseball Hall of Fame
Art Kenney 1938, LHP in MLB Boston Bees 1938 (Braves) Holy Cross Hall of Fame (2011)
Brendan King 2017, RHP drafted by the Chicago Cubs
Bill Lefebvre 1938, homered in first at bat as a professional baseball player
Jack McKeon 1952, manager for the World Series Champion Florida Marlins
Doc McMahon 1908, pitcher who played for the Boston Red Sox in their inaugural season
Bill Mills 1944, catcher for the 1944 Philadelphia Athletics
Joe Mulligan 1934, MLB pitcher for the Boston Red Sox
Pete Naton, 1953, catcher for the 1953 Pittsburgh Pirates
Al Niemiec 1933, second baseman for the Boston Red Sox and Philadelphia Athletics
James O'Neill 1952, pitcher; won 1952 College World Series Most Outstanding Player award
Mike Pazik 1972, drafted by the New York Yankees
Louis Sockalexis Prep-1897, first Native American player in major league baseball

Basketball

Rod Baker 1974, head coach for the ABA Champion Rochester Razorsharks
George Blaney 1961, college basketball coach and former player for the New York Knicks
Bob Cousy 1950, Basketball Hall of Fame member; former Boston Celtics player and coach
 Jehyve Floyd (born 1997), basketball player in the Israeli Basketball Premier League
Jack Foley 1962, consensus All-American who played for the Boston Celtics and the New York Knicks.
Kevin Hamilton 2006, professional basketball player and member of the Puerto Rican National Team.
Tom Heinsohn 1956, Basketball Hall of Fame member and former Boston Celtics player and coach
George Kaftan 1948, retired NBA player and a member of the New England Basketball Hall of Fame and the Holy Cross Varsity Club Hall of Fame
Lauren Manis 2020, drafted by the Las Vegas Aces of the WNBA
Malcolm Miller 2015, first player to sign a two-way contract with the Toronto Raptors and won NBA championship
Joe Mullaney 1949, drafted by the Boston Celtics and former head coach of the Los Angeles Lakers
Dermie O'Connell 1948, former NBA guard
Togo Palazzi 1954, played six seasons in the NBA; captain of the Crusaders team that won the 1954 NIT Championship
Keith Simmons 2007, professional basketball player
Torey Thomas 2006, member of the New York Knicks
Michael Vicens 1978, drafted by the New Jersey Nets and played for Puerto Rico in the Olympics
Garry Witts 1981, former NBA player

Football
Bill Adams 1972, former offensive guard in the NFL for the Buffalo Bills
Daniel Adams 2006, linebacker for 2007 champion United States national American football team
Patrick Barry (Defensive Back) intercepted Doug Flutie on the day he won the Heisman Trophy (Dec 1, 1984)
Clyde Christensen, football coach at Holy Cross, later coached in the NFL
Kevin Coyle, football coach at Holy Cross, later coached in the NFL
Bob Dee 1955, three-sport letterman at the College of the Holy Cross; one of the first players signed by the Boston Patriots
Jackson Dennis 2020, signed by the Arizona Cardinals
Mark Duffner, football head coach at Holy Cross, later coached in the NFL
Fred Farrier 1994, wide receiver at Holy Cross
Gill Fenerty 1986, award-winning all-star running back with the CFL Toronto Argonauts and later with the NFL New Orleans Saints
Chandler Fenner 2012, Super Bowl champion as well as CFL Grey Cup Winner
Dave Fipp, football coach at Holy Cross, later coached in the NFL
Lee Hull 1988, NFL wide receiver coach for the Indianapolis Colts
Ed Jenkins 1972, wide receiver for the Miami Dolphins, Buffalo Bills, and New York Giants
Bruce Kozerski 1984, played center for the Cincinnati Bengals for twelve seasons
Gordon Lockbaum 1988, College Football Hall of Fame member
Anthony Manfreda 1929, played in the NFL; holds the Holy Cross record for most yards gained in a kickoff return
Nick McBeath 2018, linebacker signed by the Ottawa Redblacks in the CFL
Mike McCabe 2012, offensive lineman signed by the Green Bay Packers; his father played for the Washington Redskins
Jim Moran 1934, guard in the National Football League for the Boston Redskins; father of James P. Moran Jr.
Jon Morris 1964, All-American center; named to the second team, All-Time All-AFL for his years playing for the Boston Patriots
Jimmy Murray 2018, offensive lineman signed by the Kansas City Chiefs 2019, 2020, 2021 Offensive Lineman New York Jets
Andy Natowich 1940, former running back in the National Football League for the Washington Redskins
Bill Osmanski 1939, Chicago Bears fullback, member of the NFL 1940s All-Decade Team, the College Football Hall of Fame, and a licensed dentist
Peter Pujals 2018, QB in the NFL and AAF
Vince Promuto 1960, Washington Redskins guard from 1960 to 1970
George Pyne II, American football player
Dominic Randolph 2010, Walter Payton Award candidate and QB for the New York Giants
Kalif Raymond 2016, wide receiver and punt returner for the Detroit Lions
Mike Sherman, football coach at Holy Cross, later coached in the NFL
Benton Whitley 2022, outside linebacker Los Angeles Rams
Jim Zyntell 1933, offensive lineman in the National Football League

Ice hockey

Nicole Giannino 2015, professional hockey player
Erin Hall 2017, professional hockey player
Scott Pooley 2018, ECHL champion
Patrick Rissmiller 2002, New Jersey Devils coach and has played in the NHL for the San Jose Sharks, New York Rangers, and Atlanta Thrashers
James Sixsmith 2007, professional hockey player
Jim Stewart 1979, goaltender Boston Bruins
 Maeve Christ 2020, holds the only positive plus/minus in Holy Cross Division 1 Hockey East history

Other sports
Frank Carroll 1960, Olympic figure skating coach, former competitive skater
Bob Daughters 1936, MLB player and former president of the Holy Cross Varsity Club
Neil Fingleton 2004, the United Kingdom's tallest British-born man, professional basketball player, actor, and clothing retailer
Keitani Graham 2003, competed in London 2012 Olympic Games as a wrestler for Micronesia
Paul Harney 1952, professional golfer and golf course owner; won 11 professional events including six on the PGA Tour; in 2005, enshrined into the PGA of America Hall of Fame
Andrew Kelly 1917, former world record holder in the 300 yard dash
Leo Larrivee 1925, winner of bronze medal in 3000 m team at the 1924 Summer Olympics
Patrick McCann, 2013, professional soccer player for Finn Harps FC
Alejandro Melean 2010, professional soccer player for the Bolivian club Oriente Petrolero
Paul Pearl 1989, men's ice hockey head coach at Holy Cross
James F. "Jimmy" Quinn 1928, winner of gold medal in 4 × 100 m relay at the 1928 Summer Olympics
Richard Regan 1976, Athletic Director at Holy Cross; former operations director of NFL International
Kevin Swords 1982, most "capped" player on the Eagles, the U.S. national rugby team; played in the 1987 World Cup Rugby and captained the US team in the 1991 World Cup
Willie Turnesa 1938, known as "Willie the Wedge", one of 13 men who have won both the British Amateur (1947) and U.S. Amateur Championships (1938, 1948)
Ralph Willard 1967, former NBA coach; head coach of the Holy Cross basketball team

Notable Holy Cross faculty
Patricia Bizzell, Ph.D., prolific author and former Chairperson of the English Department
John Esposito, Ph.D., widely published professor of Islamic Studies; former Holy Cross Middle East Studies and Religious Studies Chair
Osvaldo Golijov, Ph.D., Grammy Award-winning composer; assistant professor of music
Claudia Koonz, Ph.D., feminist historian of Nazi Germany
Shirish Korde, Ph.D., composer; Chair of the Music Department; founder of Neuma Records
Joseph T. O'Callahan, first chaplain Medal of Honor recipient; former director of Holy Cross Mathematics Department
Thomas Worcester, historian on the Catholic Church and the Papacy, current President of Regis College, Toronto

Presidents of the College

References

College of the Holy Cross alumni